Italy competed at the 1975 Mediterranean Games in Algiers, Algeria.

Medals

Athletics

Men

Women

See also
 Basketball at the 1975 Mediterranean Games
 Boxing at the 1975 Mediterranean Games
 Football at the 1975 Mediterranean Games
 Swimming at the 1975 Mediterranean Games
 Volleyball at the 1975 Mediterranean Games
 Water polo at the 1975 Mediterranean Games

References

External links
 Mediterranean Games Athletic results at Gbrathletics.com
 1975 - ALGIERS (ALG) at CIJM web site

Nations at the 1975 Mediterranean Games
1975
Mediterranean Games